Lawksawk Township is a township of Taunggyi District in the Shan State of Myanmar. The principal town is Lawksawk.

Geography
Lawksawk Township is bounded on the north by the townships of Nawnghkio, Kyaukme, and Hsipaw; on the east by Mong Kung and Hopong; on the south by Taunggyi, Kalaw, and Pingdaya; and on the west by Ywangan. It is the northernmost township in the Taunggyi District.

Lawksawk is situated in a mountainous region with ranges generally running north and south, divided by broad valleys. Most of the township is within the drainage basins of two rivers, the Zawgyi and the Nam Lang.

History

Saohpas of Lawksawk
Lawksawk has traditionally been ruled by a saohpa (chieftain). The following is a list of the known saohpas of Lawksawk:
 Hkun Sam Lik 1791–1811
 On Gaing 1812–1813
 Hkun Shwe Ek 1813–1850
 Vacant 1850–1854
 Sao Weng (first time) 1854–1881
 Occupied by Yawnghwe 1881–1886
 Sao Weng (second time) 1886–1887
 Bo Saing (regent) 1887
 Hkun Nu 1887–1900
 Sao Hkun Nsok 1900–1946
 Sao Hkun Hsa 1946–1952

References

Townships of Shan State